Abū Hāshim Muḥammad ibn Ja‘far al-Ḥasanī al-‘Alawī (d. 1094/1095) was the first Emir of Mecca from the sharifian dynasty of the Hawashim. He was appointed Emir by Ali al-Sulayhi in 455 AH (1063) and died in 487 AH (1094/1095) at over the age of 70. During his reign he switched his allegiance multiple times between the Fatimids and the Abbasids. Ibn al-Athir writes, "There was nothing about him that was praiseworthy." Al-Dhahabi writes, "He was unjust, lacking in goodness." 
He was succeeded by his son Qasim.

Ancestry
He was Abu Hashim Muhammad ibn Ja'far ibn Muhammad ibn Abd Allah ibn Abi Hashim Muhammad ibn al-Husayn ibn  ibn  ibn  ibn  ibn  ibn  ibn al-Hasan ibn Ali.

Sources 

Date of birth unknown
Date of death unknown
11th-century Arabs
11th-century monarchs in the Middle East
Sharifs of Mecca